The New Oxford Formation is a mapped bedrock unit consisting primarily of sandstones, conglomerates, and shales.
The New Oxford Formation was first described in  Adams County, Pennsylvania in 1929, and over the following decade was mapped in adjacent York County, Pennsylvania and Frederick County, Maryland.  It was described as "red shale and sandstone with beds of micaceous sandstone, arkose, and conglomerate."  The majority of this early mapping was done by George Willis Stose, Anna Isabel Jonas, and Florence Bascom.

Depositional Environment
The New Oxford Formation and other formations of the Newark Supergroup were deposited in the Gettysburg Basin, just one of many Triassic rift basins existing on the east coast of North and South America, which formed as plate tectonics pulled apart Pangaea into the continents we see today.

Stratigraphy
The New Oxford Formation is overlain by the Gettysburg Formation in Frederick County, Maryland and in Adams, Cumberland, Lancaster, and York Counties in Pennsylvania.  In all other areas to the northeast in Pennsylvania the New Oxford Formation is overlain by the Hammer Creek Formation.

The New Oxford Formation overlies precambrian and paleozoic rocks at the bottom of the Gettysburg Basin.

The New Oxford Formation is not divided into members.

Paleofauna

Vertebrate paleofauna 
The New Oxford Formation contains mainly tetrapod fossils, including dinosaur remains.

Paleoflora 

 Acrostichites linnaeaefolius
 Acrostichites microphyllus
 Anomozamites princeps
 Araucarites? pennsylvaninicus
 Araucarites yorkensis
 Asterocarpus falcatus
 Baiera muensteriana
 Brachyphyllum yorkense
 cf. Brachyphyllum cf. yorkense
 Cheirolepis muensteri
 Cladophlebis reticulata
 Conewagia longiloba
 Ctenophyllum grandifolium
 Ctenophyllum wannerianum 
 Cycademyelon yorkense
 Cycadeospermum wanneri
 Dioonites carnallianus
 Equisetum rogersii
 Lonchopteris oblonga
 Macrotaeniopteris magnifolia
 Palissya diffusa
 Palissya sphenolepis
 Podozamites distans
 Pseudoddanaeopis plana
 Pterophyllum inaequale
 Sagenopteris sp.
 Schizolepis liaso-kueperinus
 Sphenozamites rogersianus
 Taeniopteris? yorkensis 
 Thinnfeldia? reticulata 
 Yorkia gramineoides
 Zamites pennsylvanicus
 Zamites yorkensis

Age
Relative age dating of the New Oxford Formation places it in the Late Triassic period, around ~221.5–205.6 Ma (Norian-Rhaetian), possibly reaching as old as 230 Ma (Carnian) in some places.

See also
 List of dinosaur-bearing rock formations

References

Triassic geology of Pennsylvania
Carnian Stage